Enchanted Rock is a pink granite mountain located in the Llano Uplift about  north of Fredericksburg, Texas and  south of Llano, Texas, United States. Enchanted Rock State Natural Area, which includes Enchanted Rock and surrounding land, spans the border between Gillespie and Llano counties, south of the Llano River. It is the largest pink granite monadnock in the United States. Enchanted Rock State Natural Area, a part of the Texas state park system, includes . In 1936, the area was designated a Recorded Texas Historic Landmark. In 1971, Enchanted Rock was designated as a National Natural Landmark by the National Park Service.

Enchanted Rock was rated in 2017 as the best campsite in Texas in a 50-state survey.

Geology

The prominent granite dome is visible for many miles in the surrounding basin of the Llano Uplift. The weathered dome, standing above the surrounding plain, is known to geologists as a monadnock. The rock is actually the visible above-ground part of a segmented ridge, the surface expression of a large igneous batholith, called the Town Mountain Granite of middle Precambrian material that intruded into earlier metamorphic schist, called the Packsaddle Schist. The intrusive granite of the rock mass, or pluton, was exposed by extensive erosion of the surrounding sedimentary rock, primarily the Cretaceous Edwards limestone, which is exposed a few miles to the south of Enchanted Rock.

Enchanted Rock State Natural Area and Conservation
Park  activities include caving, hiking, primitive backpack camping, rock climbing and picnicking.  The Summit Trail is the most popular hiking path.

The Granite Gripper is an annual rock climbing competition that acts as a fundraiser for park conservation through the Friends of Enchanted Rock. Emphasis is placed on activity safety and ecological preservation.  Visitors are asked to keep human incursion at a minimum by not disturbing plants, animals, or artifacts.  Federal and state statutes, regulations, and rules governing archeological and historic sites apply. The state Game Warden as a commissioned peace officer is authorized to inspect natural resources and take any necessary action for the preservation of the resources. As of March 1, 2016, dogs are not allowed on the summit trail anymore.

Texas Parks and Wildlife Department partners with Friends of Enchanted Rock, a volunteer-based nonprofit organization that works for the improvement and preservation of Enchanted Rock State Natural Area. Scheduled Summit Trail tours are the third Saturday of the month starting  April, May, September, October, November, and December. Private tours are available for groups at other times.

Flora and fauna

More than 500 species of plants, from four chief plant communities — open oak woodland, mesquite grassland, floodplain, and granite rock community — inhabit the rock. Vernal pools, ecologically threatened depressions of flora and fauna adapted to harsh environments, contain fragile invertebrate fairy shrimp. Other wildlife includes bats, ringtails, squirrels, and foxes. A wide variety of lizards, including the Texas horned lizard, also makes the Enchanted Rock area their home.

Designated a key bird watching site, bird enthusiasts can observe wild turkey, greater roadrunner, golden-fronted woodpecker, Woodhouse's scrub jay, canyon towhee, rufous-crowned sparrow, black-throated sparrow, lesser goldfinch, common poorwill, chuck-will's-widow, black-chinned hummingbird, vermilion flycatcher, scissor-tailed flycatcher, Bell's vireo, yellow-throated vireo, blue grosbeak, painted bunting, orchard oriole, vesper sparrow, fox sparrow, Harris's sparrow, and lark sparrow.

History

Archaeological  evidence indicates human visitation at the rock going back at least  11,000 years.

According to the book  The Enchanted Rock published in 1999 by Ira Kennedy 

These hunter-gatherers had flint-tipped spears, fire, and stories. With  these resources, some 12,000 years  ago, the first Texans became the wellspring of  Plains Indian culture. On the basis of  archaeological evidence, human habitation at  Enchanted Rock can be  traced back at least 10,000 years. The oldest authenticated projectile point found within the  present-day park is a Plainview point type, dating back 10,000 years.

The rock has been the subject of numerous geological surveys and  paintings.

Vandalism
In 2016, two citizens of San Marcos, Texas, were arrested for vandalizing the "south face of the summit at Enchanted Rock State Park". The summit was vandalized with graffiti again in 2018 and no arrests have been made in that case. The vandalism is a state felony in Texas, carrying "a penalty of up to two years in state jail and a $10,000 fine if convicted".

Legends
Folklore of local Tonkawa, Apache and Comanche tribes ascribes magical and spiritual powers to the rock (hence the name Enchanted Rock). While attempting to hide from Anglo settlers in the area, the natives would hide on the top two tiers of the rock, where they were invisible from the ground below. The first European to visit the area was probably Álvar Núñez Cabeza de Vaca in 1536. The Tonkawa, who inhabited the area in the 16th century, believed that ghost fires flickered at the top of the dome. In particular, they heard unexplained creaking and groaning, which geologists attribute to night-time contraction of the rock after being heated by the sun during the day. The name "Enchanted Rock" derives from Spanish and Anglo-Texan interpretations of such legends and related folklore; the name "Crying Rock" has also been given to the formation.

A plaque formerly embedded in Enchanted Rock near the top, but now removed to a kiosk below, reads:

Other legends 
   associated with Enchanted Rock are:

Named "Spirit Song Rock" for native legends
Revered by native tribes as a holy portal to other worlds
Anyone spending the night on the rock becomes invisible
Spanish priest fled to the rock pursued by native tribes, disappeared, and returned to tell a mystic tale of falling into a cavern and being swallowed by the rock, encountering many spirits in the tunnels, eventually to be spit out two days later
Haunted by spirits of warriors of a now-extinct Native American tribe who were slaughtered at Enchanted Rock by a rival tribe
Haunted by a Native American princess who threw herself off the rock after witnessing the slaughter of her people
Alleged sacrifices at the rock by both Comanche and Tonkawa tribes
Believed to be a lost silver mine, or the lost El Dorado gold
Bad fortune and death will befall anyone who climbs the rock with bad intent
Footprint indentations on the rock of Native American chief who sacrificed his daughter, condemned to walk Enchanted Rock forever
Woman's screams at night are of a white woman who took refuge on Enchanted Rock after escaping a kidnapping by Native Americans
Spanish soldier Don Jesús Navarro's Enchanted Rock rescue of native maiden Rosa, daughter of Chief Tehuan, after her kidnap by Comanches intent on sacrificing her on the rock

See also

Albert, Texas
Cherry Springs Dance Hall
Doss, Texas
Easter Fire
Harper, Texas
List of National Natural Landmarks in Texas
National Register of Historic Places listings in Gillespie County, Texas
National Register of Historic Places listings in Llano County, Texas
Spy Rock
Stonewall, Texas
Texas Hill Country

References

Further reading

External links

Enchanted Rock State Natural Area 
 Texas Parks official web page

E-Rock: Virtual Trip to Enchanted Rock
Technical rock climbing at Enchanted Rock
Home movie of Enchanted Rock, The Steve Gomez Collection, no. 1 - Hiking Enchanted Rock, Texas Archive of the Moving Image

Granite domes
Rock formations of Texas
Landforms of Gillespie County, Texas
Landforms of Llano County, Texas
State parks of Texas
National Natural Landmarks in Texas
Native American history of Texas
Religious places of the indigenous peoples of North America
Igneous petrology of Texas
Monoliths of the United States
Batholiths of North America
Inselbergs of North America
National Register of Historic Places in Gillespie County, Texas
Protected areas of Gillespie County, Texas
Protected areas of Llano County, Texas
Texas Hill Country
Archaeological sites on the National Register of Historic Places in Texas
Mesoproterozoic magmatism